River House is a historic building in the city centre of York, in England.

The building was constructed in 1868, as the Yorkshire Club.  The Yorkshire Club had been founded in 1839, at 5 St Leonard's Place, and grew by absorbing the Yorkshire Union Hunt Club in 1856.  With its larger membership, it decided to move to bigger, purpose-built premises, on a prominent site on the south side of Museum Street, next to Lendal Bridge.  The site enabled it to have a private waterfront area on the River Ouse, which is now the Lendal Boatyard.  Inside, there was a dining room, bar, billiards room, studies and bedrooms.

The club closed some time after World War II, and was converted to offices.  It was Grade II listed in 1971.  By 1980, it housed Savills estate agents.  From the early 2000s, Pizza Express occupied half the building.  It was refurbished in 2017.

The building was designed by Charles Jocelyn Parnell and it is built of brick, with stone dressings and quoins, and granite columns.  It has a basement, two main storeys, and attics.  The central part of the building is three bays wide, with single-bay wings either side.  On the Museum Street front, a portico fills the space between the wings, with a balcony above, and a projecting porch in the centre.  The river front is of four bays, with the basement above ground, and a ground floor terrace supported by cast iron columns.

References

Buildings and structures completed in 1868
Grade II listed buildings in York
Museum Street (York)